Pachymatisma johnstonia is a species of sponge belonging to the family Geodiidae. A species of the north-eastern Atlantic coasts, this is a usually grey encrusting sponge with large prominent oscula and a pale yellow interior. The size and form depends largely on the extent of its exposure to waves. In heavily wave-exposed locations, it is usually small and thin but in more sheltered places can grow to over 50 cm across and 15 cm thick.

References
Pachymatisma johnstonia at World Register of Marine Species

Tetractinellida
Animals described in 1842
Taxa named by James Scott Bowerbank